In the Battle of Bornhöved or, possibly ‘’’*Vir·Gento·Vedo’’’, on the field of Sventanafeld (Sventanapolje or "Schwentine field") near the village of Bornhöved near Neumünster in 798 the Obodrites, led by Drożko, allied with the Franks, defeated the Nordalbingian Saxons.

Background 
The situation before the battle resulted from the migrations that occurred during 6th and 7th centuries onto the territory of Holstein. In the process Danes settled the northern part, Slavic Obodrites the eastern part (Wagria) and Saxons from the south migrated into western Holstein. The battle was part of the effort by the Frankish emperor, Charlemagne, to conquer and convert Old Saxony.

The battle

The allied forces of Obodrites led by Drożko and Franks led by legatus Eburisus defeated Nordliudi (the 'Northern people') - in other words the Saxons. According to the chronicle, the Saxons lost 4,000 warriors and were forced to flee the battlefield. The contemporary Lorsch Annals give the smaller number of 2,901 dead Saxons.

Results
The victory of Charlemagne in the battle finally broke the resistance of the Nordalbingian Saxons to Christianisation. The limit of influence between Denmark and the Frankish Empire was successfully established on the Eider River in 811. This boundary was to remain in place almost without a break for the next thousand years. In 810 the Limes Saxoniae - the fortified line to protect Frankish-Saxon territories from further attacks by the Obodrites from Ostholstein - was mentioned for the first time.

See also 
 Battle of Bornhöved (1227)

References 

Bornhoved 0798
Obotrites
8th century in Germany
790s conflicts
798
Segeberg